Moody Beach is a private beach located in Wells, Maine. About 100 homes adjoin the beach.  Moody Beach has a blend of year-round and summer residents, as well as short-term vacationers from around New England and Quebec.  It stretches from Ogunquit Beach to Moody Point on Ocean Avenue. It is about a mile long.

Moody Beach is central in the debate over public access versus private rights to the Maine shore. In March 1989, the Maine Supreme Judicial Court sided with homeowners in Bell v. Town of Wells, also known as the Moody Beach case. The court affirmed that, in Maine, owners of beachfront property or property adjoining tidelands have private property rights to the low-water mark or low tide area, subject only to a public easement for “fishing, fowling, and navigation.”  The case is often cited as authority for the notion that the public has only very limited rights in intertidal zone (the area between high and low tide).

References

Beaches of Maine
Wells, Maine
Landforms of York County, Maine